Charles Masson (1800–1853) was the pseudonym of James Lewis, a British East India Company soldier, independent explorer and pioneering archaeologist and numismatist. He was the first European to discover the ruins of Harappa near Sahiwal in Punjab, now in Pakistan. He found the ancient city of Alexandria in the Caucasus (modern Begram) dating to Alexander the Great.  He unlocked the now-extinct language known as Kharoshthi.

At the time of the 1838 First Anglo-Afghan War, Masson had spent more time in Afghanistan then any other British subject. He was a minority voice critical of the invasion and accurately predicted it would be a disaster for the Empire.

Early life
Charles Masson was born on 16 February 1800 at 58 Aldermanbury within the City of London. He was the elder son of George Lewis and Mary Hopcraft. His father was a tradesman and a member of the Needlemakers Company. His mother's family were farmers in Croughton, Northamptonshire, who subsequently became brewers. His younger brother George was born in 1803.  Charles went to school in Walthamstow, almost certainly Monoux School (now Sir George Monoux College), where he learned some Latin and Greek. On leaving school he worked as a clerk with a silk and insurance broker in the city. When aged 21 he enlisted with the army of the British East India Company and sailed for Bengal on 17 January 1822.

Travels

He fought in the Siege of Bharatpur in January 1826. In 1827, while stationed at Agra, he and a colleague deserted and traveled through parts of the Punjab that were under British control at that time. At Ahmadpur, they were rescued by Josiah Harlan and commissioned as mounted orderlies in his expedition to overthrow the regime in Kabul, Afghanistan. Not long afterward, near Dera Ghazi Khan, he deserted Harlan.

Between 1833 and 1838, Masson excavated over 50 Buddhist sites around Kabul and Jalalabad in south-eastern Afghanistan, amassing a large collection of small objects and many coins, principally from the site at Bagram (the ancient Alexandria on the Caucasus), north of Kabul. From 1827, when he deserted, to his return to England in 1842, it is estimated that Masson collected around 47,000 coins.

Masson was the first European to see the ruins of Harappa, described and illustrated in his book Narrative of Various Journeys in Balochistan, Afghanistan and The Punjab. He also visited the North-West Frontier Province and Balochistan, serving as an agent of the East India Company.

In the 1930s, the French Archaeological Delegation in Afghanistan (Délégation archéologique française en Afghanistan, DAFA) found unexpected evidence of an earlier European visitor scribbled in pencil on the wall of one of the caves above the 55 meter Buddha at Bamiyan:
If any fool this high samootch explore,
Know Charles Masson has been here before

Return to London
In 1841 he sailed from Bombay to Suez, crossed Egypt overland, caught a boat to France where he visited Paris, and finally arrived back in London in March 1842. He had been away for 20 years. He received a pension of £100 a year from the East India Company. On 19 February 1844 he married Mary Ann Kilby, an 18 year old farmer's daughter. They had two children, a son born in 1850 and a daughter born in 1853. Masson died, probably of a stroke, in Edmonton in north London on 5 November 1853.

Collection at the British Museum
Through his wide-ranging travels, Masson built up an extraordinary collection of artefacts largely (although not exclusively) from the modern states of Afghanistan and Pakistan. Numbering over 9,000 objects most are now held by the British Museum. The collection includes more than 7,000 coins. Beginning in 1993, a project at the museum led by Elizabeth Errington organised the material into an accessible study collection. The project resulted in the publication in 2017 and 2021 of three volumes describing the collection and linking it to the surviving documentation, much of which is held by the British Library.

Works

See also
Harappa
Indus Valley civilization

References

Sources

Further reading

External links

1800 births
1853 deaths
British numismatists
British explorers
Bengal Artillery soldiers
People from the City of London
Explorers of Central Asia
People associated with the Indus Valley civilisation